Per-Johan Johansson (born March 31, 1968) is a Swedish former professional ice hockey player.

Between 1992 and 1996, Johansson played 120 regular season games in the Swedish Elitserien with Brynäs IF.

Family
His son, Jonas (born September 19, 1995) is a goaltender within the Brynäs IF organization. Jonas won a silver medal with Team Sweden at the 2014 World Junior Ice Hockey Championships.

References

External links

1968 births
Living people
Brynäs IF players
Swedish ice hockey forwards